Edge of the World is a 2006 album by Glenn Tipton, John Entwistle, and Cozy Powell.

Edge of the World or The Edge of the World may also refer to:

Film and television
 The Edge of the World, a 1937 British film directed by Michael Powell
 Edge of the World (2018 film), an American film directed by Randy Redroad
 Edge of the World (2021 film), an adventure drama directed by Michael Haussman

Literature
 The Edge of the World (book), a 2014 history book by Michael Pye
 The Edge of the World, a 2009 Terra Incognita novel by Kevin J. Anderson

Music
 Edge of the World (composition), a 2011 concerto by Nico Muhly

Albums
 The Edge of the World (Billy Bob Thornton album) or the title song, 2003
 The Edge of the World, by The Mekons, 1986
 Edge of the World, by Mark Boals, 2002
 Edge of the World, by Randy Stonehill, 2002
 Edge of the World, by Youngblood Hawke, 2020

Songs
 "Edge of the World", by Faith No More from The Real Thing, 1989
 "Edge of the World", by the Levellers from Hello Pig, 2000
 "Edge of the World", by Lovebites from Awakening from Abyss, 2017
 "Edge of the World", by Runrig from The Big Wheel, 1991
 "Edge of the World", by Within Temptation from Hydra, 2014
 "The Edge of the World", a song by DragonForce from Reaching into Infinity, 2017

See also
 Flat Earth
 At the Edge of the World (disambiguation)
 Edge of the Earth (disambiguation)
 World's Edge, an album by Steve Roach